XHCJE-TDT, virtual channel 1 (UHF digital channel 34), is an Azteca Uno owned-and-operated television station located in  Ciudad Juárez, Chihuahua, Mexico. The station is owned by the TV Azteca subsidiary of Grupo Salinas.

History 
The station signed on in 1981, initially as a satellite of XHCH-TV, at the time a rare local station owned by then-Mexican public broadcaster Imevisión. Ricardo Salinas Pliego would acquire Imevisión in 1993, becoming TV Azteca; local facilities opened on August 11, 1992. In 2005, XHCJE-TV began broadcasting in high definition. The channel was then reassigned to channel 1 in 2016, as part of a nationwide move of Azteca Trece to that virtual channel.

XHCJE-TV shares resources with El Paso Telemundo affiliate KTDO and NBC affiliate KTSM-TV especially with violence in Juárez.

Programming 

Currently, XHCJE-TDT broadcasts the entire schedule of Azteca Uno, with local advertisements and local news broadcasts. News opt-outs Hechos Meridiano Juárez, a news program that debuted in 2001 to compete against the Noticiero 56 newscast on competing station XHJUB (now Las Noticias on XEPM). Hechos Meridiano Juárez is broadcast weekdays from 3:30 p.m. to 4:00 p.m., and is anchored by Ricardo García and Gabriela Salazar. An evening newscast, Hechos Noche Juárez, is broadcast weeknights at 10:00 p.m.-11:00 p.m., anchored by Gabriela Aguilar and Luis Alfonso Higareda. Local inserts are also broadcast during Azteca Uno's morning program, Hechos AM.

XHCJE also broadcasts games of the Indios de Ciudad Juárez soccer club, broadcast on tape delay Fridays at 11:45 p.m.

Technical information

Subchannels 
The station's digital signal is multiplexed:

On November 29, 2012, XHCJE began broadcasting the Proyecto 40 network (now known as ADN 40) on digital subchannel 34.3 (PSIP 11.2, later 1.2).

Analog-to-digital conversion 
Due to the Mexican analog-to-digital conversion mandate, XHCJE's analog signal on channel 11 left the air on July 14, 2015.

References

External links 
Azteca Uno
Azteca Locales.tv

Azteca Uno transmitters
Spanish-language television stations in Mexico
HCJE-TDT
Television channels and stations established in 1980
1980 establishments in Mexico